Hitler's Heroines: Stardom and Womanhood in Nazi Cinema is a 2003 book written by Antje Ascheid.

References

2003 non-fiction books
Books about film